As an adjective, Martian means of or pertaining to the planet Mars.

As a noun, a Martian is a hypothetical inhabitant, either alien or human, of the planet Mars. 

Martian, Martians, The Martian or The Martians may also refer to:

Arts and entertainment
 The Martian (Weir novel), a 2011 science fiction novel by Andy Weir
The Martian (film), a 2015 film directed by Ridley Scott, based on the Weir novel
 The Martian (du Maurier novel), an 1898 novel by George du Maurier
 Martian (The War of the Worlds), the invaders from H. G. Wells' 1898 novel The War of the Worlds and its adaptations and offshoots
 Marvin the Martian, a Warner Bros. cartoon character, first appearing in 1948
 The Martian a.k.a. "Uncle Martin", a character in the 1963 television series, My Favorite Martian
 The Martians (1999 book), a collection of short stories supplementing the Mars trilogy by Kim Stanley Robinson
 The Martian (musician) (AKA Mike Banks, active from 1987), American record producer active in Detroit techno
 The Martians (band), a Scottish band formed in 2001
 The name used for the Martius family of ancient Rome in William Shakespeare's play Coriolanus
According to the book Men are from Mars, a Martian is a man

Other uses
 The Martians (scientists), a group of scientists and other notable persons from Hungary, formed in the early half of the 20th century
 Martian Watches, a brand of American smart watch founded in 2007
 Martians, the mascot of Goodrich High School – see Goodrich Area Schools
 Martian packet, an IP packet with an invalid source or destination address
 Martian language, an orthographic dialect from China.
 An alternate spelling of Roman emperor Marcian

See also
 Life on Mars
 Human mission to Mars
 Colonization of Mars
 Mars (disambiguation)
 Martia (disambiguation)